Soft washing is a cleaning method using low pressure water.  More recently, the term "softwashing" has been used to describe any form of spraying chemicals at buildings where solutions (typically bleach) are used to remove mildew, bacteria, algae and other organic stains from roofs and other building exteriors.

It is so named to differentiate the method from power washing. The Asphalt Roofing Manufacturers Association recommends low-pressure bleach or detergent assisted washing as the preferred method for cleaning asphalt roofs in order to prevent damage to the shingles.  

Soft washing is simply spraying water at low pressure via, pressure washer, electric or air pump.

Soft washing Equipment is not distinctly different than power and pressure washing equipment.

References 

Cleaning methods